= Language exchange (Austrian education) =

Language exchange (German: Sprachentausch) is an option of language learning offered by the School Education Act in Austria. If a curriculum of a school includes both mandatory foreign language instruction and classes in the student's native language which is not German, then the student's first language is graded according to the standards for the official language of instruction (German). This practice is not widespread.
